Brigadier Kamakhya Prasad Singh Deo AVSM (born 6 August 1941), the scion of Dhenkanal is a former Member of Parliament and a retired Indian Territorial Army officer. He was a member of the 4th, 7th, 8th, 10th, 11th and 13th Lok Sabha. He was first elected to Lok Sabha in 1967 representing Swatantra Party.

Details

Political career
K.P. Singh Dev is the son of the late Shankar Pratap Singh Dev, the last Raja of Dhenkanal.

In the 1967 Lok Sabha elections, he stood as a candidate for the Swatantra Party and was elected from the Dhenkanal constituency of Odisha. Aged 25, he was among the youngest MPs elected that year. From 1967 until 1970, he served as chief whip for the party in the Lok Sabha. By 1980, he had transferred his allegiance to the Indian National Congress. He was the president of the Orissa Pradesh Congress Committee.

Military career
Singh Dev was commissioned a Territorial Army second lieutenant in the Regiment of Artillery on 1 June 1971.  He was awarded Ati Vishisht Seva Medal (AVSM) in 1994. He was ADC to the President of India. Upon reaching retirement age, he was promoted colonel on 30 August 1995, and retired the following day. On 10 October 1997, he was granted the honorary rank of brigadier.

He contested in the General Election 2019 as an Indian National Congress candidate from Dhenkanal . Not only did he get defeated in that election, he also lost election deposit.

Dates of rank

References

External links
 Members of 13th Lok Sabha - Parliament of India website

Bharatiya Janata Party politicians from Odisha
Indian National Congress politicians from Odisha
India MPs 1967–1970
India MPs 1980–1984
India MPs 1984–1989
India MPs 1991–1996
India MPs 1996–1997
India MPs 1999–2004
1941 births
Living people
Swatantra Party politicians
Lok Sabha members from Odisha
Rajya Sabha members from Odisha
Ministers for Information and Broadcasting of India
People from Dhenkanal
Indian Army officers
Indian military personnel of the Indo-Pakistani War of 1971